is a town in Saitama Prefecture, Japan. , the town had an estimated population of 28,971 in 12,989 households and a population density of 480 persons per km2.

Geography
Ogawa is located in central Saitama Prefecture in the Ogawa basin and is surrounded by the Sotochichibu Mountains.

Surrounding municipalities
Saitama Prefecture
Ranzan
Tokigawa
Yorii
Higashichichibu

Climate
Ogawa has a humid subtropical climate (Köppen Cfa) characterized by warm summers and cool winters with light to no snowfall.  The average annual temperature in Ogawa is 14.0 °C. The average annual rainfall is 1746 mm with September as the wettest month. The temperatures are highest on average in August, at around 26.3 °C, and lowest in January, at around 3.0 °C.

Demographics
Per Japanese census data, the population of Ogawa peaked around the year 2000 and has declined since.

History
The village of Ogawa was created within Hiki District, Saitama with the establishment of the modern municipalities system on April 1, 1889. Ogawa annexed the neighboring villages of Okawa, Takezawa and Yawata on February 1, 1955. Tokigawa and Tamagawa merged to form the town of Tokigawa.

Government
Ogawa has a mayor-council form of government with a directly elected mayor and a unicameral town council of 16 members. Ogawa, together with the towns of Tokigawa, Ranzan and Namekawa, contributes one member to the Saitama Prefectural Assembly. In terms of national politics, the town is part of Saitama 10th district of the lower house of the Diet of Japan.

Economy
The town used to be famous for Japanese traditional papermaking (washi).

Education
Ogawa has six public elementary schools and three public middle schools operated by the town government, and one public high school operated by the Saitama Prefectural Board of Education.

Transportation

Railway
 JR East - Hachikō Line
 -  
 Tōbu Railway -  Tōbu Tōjō Line
 -

Highway

References

External links

Official Website 

Towns in Saitama Prefecture
Hiki District, Saitama
Ogawa, Saitama